Jacqueline Pascal (4 October 1625 – 4 October 1661), sister of Blaise Pascal, was born at Clermont-Ferrand, Auvergne, France.

Like her brother she was a prodigy, composing verses when only eight years old, and a five-act comedy at eleven. In 1646, the influence of her brother converted her to Jansenism. Then in 1652, she took the veil, and entered Port-Royal Abbey, Paris, despite the strong opposition of her brother, and subsequently was largely instrumental in the latter's own final conversion. She vehemently opposed the attempt to compel the assent of the nuns to the Papal bulls condemning Jansenism, but was at last compelled to yield. This blow, however, hastened her death, which occurred at Paris on 4 October 1661, the same day she turned 36.

References 

1625 births
1661 deaths
Clergy from Clermont-Ferrand
Jansenists
French poets
Cistercian nuns
17th-century French nuns
Blaise Pascal